() is a 1925 autobiographical manifesto by Nazi Party leader Adolf Hitler. The work describes the process by which Hitler became antisemitic and outlines his political ideology and future plans for Germany. The book was edited first by Emil Maurice, then by Hitler's deputy Rudolf Hess.

Hitler began  while imprisoned following his failed coup in Munich in November 1923 and a trial in February 1924 for high treason, in which he received a sentence of five years. Although he received many visitors initially, he soon devoted himself entirely to the book. As he continued, he realized that it would have to be a two-volume work, with the first volume scheduled for release in early 1925. The governor of Landsberg noted at the time that "he [Hitler] hopes the book will run into many editions, thus enabling him to fulfill his financial obligations and to defray the expenses incurred at the time of his trial." After slow initial sales, the book became a bestseller in Germany following Hitler's rise to power in 1933.

After Hitler's death, copyright of  passed to the state government of Bavaria, which refused to allow any copying or printing of the book in Germany. In 2016, following the expiration of the copyright held by the Bavarian state government,  was republished in Germany for the first time since 1945, which prompted public debate and divided reactions from Jewish groups. A team of scholars from the Institute of Contemporary History in Munich published a German language two-volume almost 2,000-page edition annotated with about 3,500 notes. This was followed in 2021 by a 1,000-page French edition based on the German annotated version, with about twice as much commentary as text.

Title
Hitler originally wanted to call his forthcoming book  (Four and a Half Years [of Struggle] Against Lies, Stupidity and Cowardice). Max Amann, head of the Franz Eher Verlag and Hitler's publisher, is said to have suggested the much shorter  ("My Struggle").

Contents
The arrangement of chapters is as follows:

Volume One: A Reckoning
Chapter 1: In the House of My Parents
Chapter 2: Years of Study and Suffering in Vienna
Chapter 3: General Political Considerations Based on My Vienna Period
Chapter 4: Munich
Chapter 5: The World War
Chapter 6: War Propaganda
Chapter 7: The Revolution
Chapter 8: The Beginning of My Political Activity
Chapter 9: The "German Workers' Party"
Chapter 10: Causes of the Collapse
Chapter 11: Nation and Race
Chapter 12: The First Period of Development of the National Socialist German Workers' Party
Volume Two: The National Socialist Movement
Chapter 1: Philosophy and Party
Chapter 2: The State
Chapter 3: Subjects and Citizens
Chapter 4: Personality and the Conception of the  State
Chapter 5: Philosophy and Organization
Chapter 6: The Struggle of the Early Period – the Significance of the Spoken Word
Chapter 7: The Struggle with the Red Front
Chapter 8: The Strong Man Is Mightiest Alone
Chapter 9: Basic Ideas Regarding the Meaning and Organization of the Sturmabteilung
Chapter 10: Federalism as a Mask
Chapter 11: Propaganda and Organization
Chapter 12: The Trade-Union Question
Chapter 13: German Alliance Policy After the War
Chapter 14: Eastern Orientation or Eastern Policy
Chapter 15: The Right of Emergency Defense
Conclusion
Index

Analysis 
In , Hitler used the main thesis of "the Jewish peril", which posits a Jewish conspiracy to gain world leadership. The narrative describes the process by which he became increasingly antisemitic and militaristic, especially during his years in Vienna. He speaks of not having met a Jew until he arrived in Vienna, and that at first his attitude was liberal and tolerant. When he first encountered the antisemitic press, he says, he dismissed it as unworthy of serious consideration. Later he accepted the same antisemitic views, which became crucial to his program of national reconstruction of Germany.

 has also been studied as a work on political theory. For example, Hitler announces his hatred of what he believed to be the world's two evils: communism and Judaism.

In the book, Hitler blamed Germany's chief woes on the parliament of the Weimar Republic, the Jews, and Social Democrats, as well as Marxists, though he believed that Marxists, Social Democrats, and the parliament were all working for Jewish interests. He announced that he wanted to destroy the parliamentary system completely, believing it to be corrupt in principle, as those who reach power are inherent opportunists.

Antisemitism
While historians dispute the exact date Hitler decided to exterminate the Jewish people, few place the decision before the mid-1930s. First published in 1925,  shows Hitler's personal grievances and his ambitions for creating a New Order. Hitler also wrote that The Protocols of the Elders of Zion, a fabricated text which purported to expose the Jewish plot to control the world, was an authentic document. This later became a part of the Nazi propaganda effort to justify persecution and annihilation of the Jews.

Hitler wrote "the nationalization of our masses will succeed only when, aside from all the positive struggle for the soul of our people, their international poisoners are exterminated", and he suggested that, "If at the beginning of the war and during the war twelve or fifteen thousand of these Hebrew corrupters of the nation had been subjected to poison gas, such as had to be endured in the field by hundreds of thousands of our very best German workers of all classes and professions, then the sacrifice of millions at the front would not have been in vain."

In the first edition, Hitler stated that the destruction of the weak and sick is far more humane than their protection. Apart from this allusion to humane treatment, Hitler saw a purpose in destroying "the weak" in order to provide the proper space and purity for the "strong".

Hitler described that when he was in Vienna it was repugnant for him to see the mixture of races "of Czechs, Poles, Hungarians, Ruthenians [Ukrainians], Serbs and Croats, and always that infection which dissolves human society, the Jew, were all here and there and everywhere."

He also wrote that he viewed the Japanese victory over the Russians in the Russo-Japanese War in 1904 as a "blow to Austrian Slavism".

In the chapter "Eastern Orientation or Eastern Policy", Hitler argued that the Germans needed  in the East, a "historic destiny" that would properly nurture the German people. Hitler believed that "the organization of a Russian state formation was not the result of the political abilities of the Slavs in Russia, but only a wonderful example of the state-forming efficacy of the German element in an inferior race."

In  Hitler openly stated the future German expansion in the East, foreshadowing Generalplan Ost:

Hitler wrote that he was against any attempts to Germanise Slavs and criticised the previous attempts at trying to Germanise the Austrian Slavs. He also criticised people in pan-German movements in Germany who thought that forcing ethnic Poles living in Germany to speak the German language would turn them into Germans; he believed that would have caused a "foreign race" by its own "inferiority" to damage the "dignity" and "nobility" of the German nation.

Sales

Although Hitler originally wrote  mostly for the followers of National Socialism, interest in the work grew after his rise to power. (Two other books written by party members, Gottfried Feder's Breaking The Interest Slavery and Alfred Rosenberg's The Myth of the Twentieth Century, have since lapsed into comparative literary obscurity.)

Hitler began to distance himself from the book after becoming chancellor of Germany in 1933. Nevertheless,  was a bestseller in Germany during the 1930s. During Hitler's years in power, the book was in high demand in libraries and often reviewed and quoted in other publications. It was given free to every newlywed couple and every soldier fighting at the front. By 1939, it had sold 5.2 million copies in eleven languages. By the end of the war, about 10 million copies of the book had been sold or distributed in Germany.

Contemporary observations
, in essence, lays out the ideological program Hitler established for the Holocaust, by identifying the Jews and "Bolsheviks" as racially and ideologically inferior and threatening, and "Aryans" and National Socialists as racially superior and politically progressive. Hitler's revolutionary goals included expulsion of the Jews from Greater Germany and the unification of German peoples into one Greater Germany. Hitler desired to restore German lands to their greatest historical extent, real or imagined.

Due to its racist content and the historical effect of Nazism upon Europe during World War II and the Holocaust, it is considered a highly controversial book. Criticism has not come solely from opponents of Nazism. Italian Fascist dictator and Nazi ally Benito Mussolini was also critical of the book, saying that it was "a boring tome that I have never been able to read" and remarking that Hitler's beliefs, as expressed in the book, were "little more than commonplace clichés".

The American literary theorist and philosopher Kenneth Burke wrote a 1939 rhetorical analysis of the work, The Rhetoric of Hitler's "Battle", which revealed an underlying message of aggressive intent.

The American journalist John Gunther said in 1940 that compared to autobiographies such as Leon Trotsky's My Life or Henry Adams's The Education of Henry Adams,  was "vapid, vain, rhetorical, diffuse, prolix." However, he added that "it is a powerful and moving book, the product of great passionate feeling". He suggested that the book exhausted curious German readers, but its "ceaseless repetition of the argument, left impregnably in their minds, fecund and germinating".

Orwell suggested that the force of Hitler's personality shone through the often "clumsy" writing, capturing the magnetic allure of Hitler for many Germans. In essence, Orwell notes, Hitler offers only visions of endless struggle and conflict in the creation of "a horrible brainless empire" that "stretch[es] to Afghanistan or thereabouts". He wrote, "Whereas Socialism, and even capitalism in a more grudging way, have said to people 'I offer you a good time,' Hitler has said to them, 'I offer you struggle, danger, and death,' and as a result a whole nation flings itself at his feet." Orwell's review was written in the aftermath of the 1939 Molotov–Ribbentrop Pact, when Hitler made peace with USSR after more than a decade of vitriolic rhetoric and threats between the two nations; with the pact in place, Orwell believed, England was now facing a risk of Nazi attack and the UK must not underestimate the appeal of Hitler's ideas.

In his The Second World War, published in several volumes in the late 1940s and early 1950s, Winston Churchill wrote that he felt that after Hitler's ascension to power, no other book than  deserved more intensive scrutiny.

Later analysis
The critic George Steiner suggested that  can be seen as one of several books that resulted from the crisis of German culture following Germany's defeat in World War I, comparable in this respect to the philosopher Ernst Bloch's The Spirit of Utopia (1918), the historian Oswald Spengler's The Decline of the West (1918), the theologian Franz Rosenzweig's The Star of Redemption (1921), the theologian Karl Barth's The Epistle to the Romans (1922), and the philosopher Martin Heidegger's Being and Time (1927).

On translation
A number of translators have commented on the poor quality of Hitler's use of language in writing Mein Kampf. Olivier Mannoni, who translated the 2021 French critical edition, said about the original German text that it was "An incoherent soup, one could become half-mad translating it," and said that previous translations had corrected the language, giving the false impression that Hitler was a "cultured man" with "coherent and grammatically correct reasoning".  He added "To me, making this text elegant is a crime."  Mannoni's comments are similar to those made by Ralph Manheim, who did the first English-language translation in 1943.  Mannheim wrote in the foreword to the edition "Where Hitler's formulations challenge the reader's credulity I have quoted the German original in the notes."  This evaluation of the awfulness of Hitler's prose and his inability to express his opinions coherently was shared by William S. Schlamm, who reviewed Manheim's translation in The New York Times, writing that "there was not the faintest similarity to a thought and barely a trace of language."

German publication history
While Hitler was in power (1933–1945),  came to be available in three common editions. The , or Wedding Edition, in a slipcase with the seal of the province embossed in gold onto a parchment-like cover was given free to marrying couples. This edition was a compact, but unabridged, version in a red cover and was released by the post office, available to be sent to loved ones fighting at the front. These three editions combined both volumes into the same book.

A special edition was published in 1939 in honour of Hitler's 50th birthday. It came in both dark blue and bright red boards with a gold sword on the cover. This work contained both volumes one and two. It was considered a deluxe version, relative to the smaller and more common .

The book could also be purchased as a two-volume set during Hitler's rule, and was available in soft cover and hardcover. The soft cover edition contained the original cover (as pictured at the top of this article). The hardcover edition had a leather spine with cloth-covered boards. The cover and spine contained an image of three brown oak leaves.

2016 critical edition
Along with the rest of his wealth and property, Hitler left the rights to the book to the German state. As Hitler's official place of residence was in Munich the copyright passed to the government of Bavaria, which refused to allow it to be republished.  The copyright ran out on December 31, 2015.

On 3 February 2010, the Institute of Contemporary History (IfZ) in Munich announced plans to republish an annotated version of the text, for educational purposes in schools and universities, in 2015. The book had last been published in Germany in 1945. The IfZ argued that a republication was necessary to get an authoritative annotated edition by the time the copyright ran out, which might open the way for neo-Nazi groups to publish their own versions. The Bavarian Finance Ministry opposed the plan, citing respect for victims of the Holocaust. It stated that permits for reprints would not be issued, at home or abroad. This would also apply to a new annotated edition.

There was disagreement about the issue of whether the republished book might be banned as Nazi propaganda. The Bavarian government emphasized that even after expiration of the copyright, "the dissemination of Nazi ideologies will remain prohibited in Germany and is punishable under the penal code". However, the Bavarian Science Minister Wolfgang Heubisch supported a critical edition, stating in 2010: "Once Bavaria's copyright expires, there is the danger of charlatans and neo-Nazis appropriating this infamous book for themselves."

On 12 December 2013, the Bavarian government cancelled its financial support for an annotated edition. IfZ, which was preparing the translation, announced that it intended to proceed with publication after the copyright expired.

Richard Verber, vice-president of the Board of Deputies of British Jews, stated in 2015 that the board trusted the academic and educational value of republishing. "We would, of course, be very wary of any attempt to glorify Hitler or to belittle the Holocaust in any way," Verber declared to The Observer. "But this is not that. I do understand how some Jewish groups could be upset and nervous, but it seems it is being done from a historical point of view and to put it in context."

The two-volume edition included about 3,500 notes, and was almost 2,000 pages long. Usually, according to Gerhard Weinberg, the information in the annotated edition that accompanies a chapter is mostly about when the chapter was written, though "in some cases" there is commentary on the nature and argument of the chapter.

The book's publication led to public debate in Germany, and divided reactions from Jewish groups, with some supporting, and others opposing, the decision to publish. German officials had previously said they would limit public access to the text amid fears that its republication could stir neo-Nazi sentiment. Some bookstores stated that they would not stock the book. Dussmann, a Berlin bookstore, stated that one copy was available on the shelves in the history section, but that it would not be advertised and more copies would be available only on order. By January 2017, the German annotated edition had sold over 85,000 copies.

Gerhard Weinberg wrote a generally positive review of the annotated edition, praising the choice to include not only editors' comments but also changes of the original text. He said that notes such as those of chapters eight and nine "will be extremely helpful" about the situation in the time of Hitler's entry into politics, and lauded the notes to chapter 11 ("People and Race") as "extensive and very helpful" as well. On the negative side, Weinberg observed that the editors make a false correction at one point; that they miss an informative book on German atrocities during World War I; that they include a survey of Nazi membership too late; and that all of his own work on Hitler goes unmentioned in the bibliography.

English translations

Ever since the early 1930s, the history of Mein Kampf in English has been complicated and has been the occasion for controversy. No fewer than four full translations were completed before 1945, as well as a number of extracts in newspapers, pamphlets, government documents and unpublished typescripts. Not all of these had official approval from his publishers, Eher Verlag. Since the war, the 1943 Ralph Manheim translation has been the most commonly published translation, though other versions have continued to circulate.

Current availability
The government of Bavaria, in agreement with the federal government of Germany, refused to allow any copying or printing of the book in Germany. It also opposed copying and printing in other countries, but with less success. As per German copyright law, the entire text entered the public domain on 1 January 2016, upon the expiration of the calendar year 70 years after the author's death.

Owning and buying the book in Germany is not an offence. Trading in old copies is lawful as well, unless it is done in such a fashion as to "promote hatred or war." In particular, the unmodified edition is not covered by §86 StGB that forbids dissemination of means of propaganda of unconstitutional organizations, since it is a "pre-constitutional work" and as such cannot be opposed to the free and democratic basic order, according to a 1979 decision of the Federal Court of Justice of Germany. In 2008, Stephan Kramer, secretary-general of the Central Council of Jews in Germany, not only recommended lifting the ban, but volunteered the help of his organization in editing and annotating the text, saying that it is time for the book to be made available to all online.

A variety of restrictions or special circumstances apply in other countries.

France 
In 1934, the French government unofficially sponsored the publication of an unauthorized translation. It was meant as a warning and included a critical introduction by Marshal Lyautey ("Every Frenchman must read this book"). It was published by far-right publisher Fernand Sorlot in an agreement with the activists of LICRA who bought 5,000 copies to be offered to "influential people"; however, most of them treated the book as a casual gift and did not read it. The Nazi regime unsuccessfully tried to have it forbidden. Hitler, as the author, and Eher-Verlag, his German publisher, had to sue for copyright infringement in the Commercial Court of France. Hitler's lawsuit succeeded in having all copies seized, the print broken up, and having an injunction against booksellers offering any copies. However, a large quantity of books had already been shipped and stayed available undercover by Sorlot.

In 1938, Hitler licensed for France an authorized edition by Fayard, translated by François Dauture and Georges Blond, lacking the threatening tone against France of the original. The French edition was 347 pages long, while the original title was 687 pages, and it was titled  ("My doctrine").

After the war, Fernand Sorlot re-edited, re-issued, and continued to sell the work, without permission from the state of Bavaria, to which the author's rights had defaulted.

In the 1970s, the rise of the extreme right in France along with the growing of Holocaust denial works, placed the  under judicial watch and in 1978, LICRA entered a complaint in the courts against the publisher for inciting antisemitism. Sorlot received a "substantial fine" but the court also granted him the right to continue publishing the work, provided certain warnings and qualifiers accompany the text.

On 1 January 2016, 70 years after Hitler's death,  entered the public domain in France.

In 2021, a 1,000 page critical edition, based on the German edition of 2016, was published in France. Titled Historiciser le mal: Une édition critique de Mein Kampf ("Historicizing Evil: A Critical Edition of Mein Kampf"), with almost twice as much commentary as text, it was edited by Florent Brayard and Andraes Wirsching, translated by Olivier Mannoni, and published by Fayard. The print run was deliberately kept small at 10,000 available only by special order, with copies set aside for public libraries. Proceeds from the sale of the edition are earmarked for the Auschwitz-Birkenau Foundation.  Some critics who had objected in advance to the edition's publication had fewer objections upon publication. One historian noted that there were so many annotations that Hitler's text had become "secondary."

India
Since its first publication in India in 1928,  has gone through hundreds of editions and sold over 100,000 copies.  was translated into various Indian languages such as Hindi, Gujarati, Malayalam, Tamil and Bengali.

Israel
An extract of Mein Kampf in Hebrew was first published in 1992 by Akadamon in a run of 400 copies. The complete translation of the book in Hebrew was published by the Hebrew University of Jerusalem in 1995. The translator was Dan Yaron, a Vienna-born retired teacher and Holocaust survivor.

Latvia

On 5 May 1995, a translation of  released by a small Latvian publishing house  began appearing in bookstores, provoking a reaction from Latvian authorities, who confiscated the approximately 2,000 copies that had made their way to the bookstores and charged director of the publishing house Pēteris Lauva with offences under anti-racism law.

In April 2018, multiple Russian-language news sites (Baltnews, Zvezda, Sputnik, Komsomolskaya Pravda and Komprava among others) reported that Adolf Hitler had allegedly become more popular in Latvia than Harry Potter, referring to a Latvian online book trading platform ibook.lv, where  had appeared at the No. 1 position in "The Most Current Books in 7 Days" list.

In research done by Polygraph.info who called the claim "false", ibook.lv was only the 878th most popular website and 149th most popular shopping site in Latvia at the time, according to Alexa Internet. In addition to that, the website only had 4 copies on sale by individual users and no users wishing to purchase the book. Owner of ibook.lv pointed out that the book list is not based on actual deals, but rather page views, of which 70% in the case of  had come from anonymous and unregistered users she believed could be fake users. Ambassador of Latvia to the Russian Federation Māris Riekstiņš responded to the story by tweeting "everyone, who wishes to know what books are actually bought and read in Latvia, are advised to address the largest book stores @JanisRoze; @valtersunrapa; @zvaigzneabc". The BBC also acknowledged the story was fake news, adding that in the last three years  had been requested for borrowing for only 139 times across all libraries in Latvia, in comparison with around 25,000 requests for books about Harry Potter.

Netherlands
In the Netherlands,  was not available for sale for years following World War II. Sale has been prohibited since a court ruling in the 1980s. In September 2018, however, Dutch publisher Prometheus officially released an academic edition of the 2016 German translation with comprehensive introductions and annotations by Dutch historians. The book is widely available to the general public in the Netherlands for the first time since World War II.

Romania
On 20 April 1993, under the sponsorship of the vice-president of the Democratic Agrarian Party of Romania, Sibiu-based Pacific publishers began issuing a Romanian edition of Mein Kampf. The local authorities promptly banned the sale and confiscated the copies, citing Article 166 of the Penal Code. Nevertheless, the ban was overturned on appeal by the Prosecutor General on 27 May 1993. Chief Rabbi Moses Rosen protested, and on 10 July 1993 President Ion Iliescu asked the Prosecutor General in writing to reinstate the ban of further printing and have the book withdrawn from the market. On 8 November 1993, the Prosecutor General rebuffed Iliescu, stating that the publication of the book was an act of spreading information, not conducting fascist propaganda.  Although Iliescu deplored this answer "in strictly judicial terms", this was the end of the matter.

Russia
In the Soviet Union, Mein Kampf was published in 1933 in a translation by Grigory Zinoviev. In the Russian Federation,  has been published at least three times since 1992; the Russian text is also available on websites. In 2006 the Public Chamber of Russia proposed banning the book. In 2009, St. Petersburg's branch of the Russian Ministry of Internal Affairs requested to remove an annotated and hyper-linked Russian translation of the book from a historiography website. On 13 April 2010, it was announced that  is outlawed on grounds of extremism promotion.

Sweden
 has been reprinted several times since 1945; in 1970, 1992, 2002 and 2010. In 1992 the Government of Bavaria tried to stop the publication of the book, and the case went to the Supreme Court of Sweden which ruled in favour of the publisher, stating that the book is protected by copyright, but that the copyright holder is unidentified (and not the State of Bavaria) and that the original Swedish publishing firm from 1934 was no longer in existence. It therefore refused the Government of Bavaria's claim. The only translation changes came in the 1970 edition, but they were only linguistic, based on a new Swedish standard.

Turkey
Mein Kampf (Turkish: Kavgam) was widely available in Turkey selling up to 100,000 copies in just two months in 2005. Analysts and commentators believe the sales of the book to be related to a rise in nationalism and anti-U.S. sentiment.  of Şalom stated this was a result of "what is happening in the Middle East, the Israeli-Palestinian problem and the war in Iraq." Doğu Ergil, a political scientist at Ankara University, said both far-right ultranationalists and extremist Islamists had found common ground – "not on a common agenda for the future, but on their anxieties, fears and hate".

United States
In the United States,  can be found at many community libraries and can be bought, sold and traded in bookshops, as it is protected by the First Amendment to the United States Constitution's freedom of speech and freedom of the press clauses. The U.S. government seized the copyright in September 1942 during the Second World War under the Trading with the Enemy Act and in 1979, Houghton Mifflin, the U.S. publisher of the book, bought the rights from the government pursuant to 28 CFR 0.47. More than 15,000 copies are sold a year.

Online availability
In 1999, the Simon Wiesenthal Center documented that the book was available in Germany via major online booksellers such as Amazon and Barnes & Noble. After a public outcry, both companies agreed to end these sales to addresses in Germany. The book remains available on Barnes and Noble's website. It is also available in multiple languages, including German, at the Internet Archive. One of the first complete English translations was published by James Vincent Murphy in 1939. The Murphy translation of the book is freely available on Project Gutenberg Australia.

Sequel

After the party's poor showing in the 1928 elections, Hitler believed that the reason for his loss was the public's misunderstanding of his ideas.

Only two copies of the 200-page manuscript were originally made, and only one of these was ever made public. To keep the document strictly secret, in 1935 Hitler ordered that it be placed in a safe in an air raid shelter. It remained there until being discovered by an American officer in 1945.

The authenticity of the document found in 1945 has been verified by Josef Berg, a former employee of the Nazi publishing house Eher Verlag, and Telford Taylor, a former brigadier general of the United States Army Reserve and Chief Counsel at the Nuremberg war-crimes trials.

Unable to find an American publisher, Weinberg turned to his mentor – Hans Rothfels at the Institute of Contemporary History in Munich, and his associate Martin Broszat – who published  in 1961. A pirated edition was published in English in New York in 1962. The first authoritative English edition was not published until 2003 (Hitler's Second Book: The Unpublished Sequel to Mein Kampf).

See also
Berlin Without Jews, a dystopian satirical novel about German antisemitism, published in the same year as Mein Kampf
Generalplan Ost, Hitler's "new order of ethnographical relations"
Ich Kämpfe
Gustave Le Bon, a main influence on this book and crowd psychology
List of books banned by governments
LTI – Lingua Tertii Imperii
Mein Kampf in Arabic
The Myth of the Twentieth Century

References
Notes

Bibliography
 

Further reading
Hitler
Hitler, A. (1925). Mein Kampf, Band 1, Verlag Franz Eher Nachfahren, München. (Volume 1, publishing company Fritz Eher and descendants, Munich).
Hitler, A. (1927). Mein Kampf, Band 2, Verlag Franz Eher Nachfahren, München. (Volume 2, after 1930 both volumes were only published in one book).
Hitler, A. (1935). Zweites Buch (trans.) Hitler's Second Book: The Unpublished Sequel to Mein Kampf by Adolf Hitler. Enigma Books. .
Hitler, A. (1945). My Political Testament. Wikisource Version.
Hitler, A. (1945). My Private Will and Testament. Wikisource Version.
Hitler, A., et al. (1971). Unmasked: two confidential interviews with Hitler in 1931. Chatto & Windus. .
Hitler, A., et al. (1974). Hitler's Letters and Notes. Harper & Row. .
Hitler, A., et al. (2008). Hitler's Table Talk. Enigma Books. .
A. Hitler. Mein Kampf, Munich: Franz Eher Nachfolger, 1930
A. Hitler, Außenpolitische Standortbestimmung nach der Reichtagswahl Juni–Juli 1928 (1929; first published as Hitlers Zweites Buch, 1961), in Hitler: Reden, Schriften, Anordnungen, Februar 1925 bis Januar 1933, Vol IIA, with an introduction by G. L. Weinberg; G. L. Weinberg, C. Hartmann and K. A. Lankheit, eds (Munich: K. G. Saur, 1995)
Christopher Browning, Initiating the Final Solution: The Fateful Months of September–October 1941, Miles Lerman Center for the Study of Jewish Resistance, U.S. Holocaust Memorial Museum (Washington, D.C.: USHMM, 2003).
Gunnar Heinsohn, "What Makes the Holocaust a Uniquely Unique Genocide", Journal of Genocide Research, vol. 2, no. 3 (2000): 411–430.
Eberhard Jäckel/Ellen Latzin, Mein Kampf (Adolf Hitler, 1925/26), published 11 May 2006, English version published 3 March 2020; in: Historisches Lexikon Bayerns

Others

External links

A review of Mein Kampf by George Orwell, first published in March 1940
Hitler's Mein Kampf Seen As Self-Help Guide For India's Business Students The Huffington Post, 22 April 2009
Hitler book bestseller in Turkey, BBC News, 18 March 2005
Protest at Czech Mein Kampf, BBC News, 5 June 2000
Mein Kampf a hit on Dhaka streets, BBC News, 27 November 2009
Hitler's book stirs anger in Azerbaijan, BBC News, 10 December 2004
"Mein Kampf:" - Adolf Hitler's book , a Deutsche Welle television documentary covering the history of the book through contemporary media and interviews with experts and German citizens, narrated in English, 15 August 2019

Online versions of Mein Kampf
German
1936 edition (172.-173. printing) in German Fraktur script (71.4 Mb)
1943 edition (3.8 MB)
German version as an audiobook, human-read (27h 17m, 741 Mb)

English 
1940 Mein Kampf: Operation Sea Lion Edition at archive.org 
Murphy translation at Gutenberg
Murphy translation at greatwar.nl (pdf, txt)
Complete Dugdale abridgment at archive.org
1939 Reynal and Hitchcock translation at archive.org.

 
1925 non-fiction books
1925 in Judaism
1926 non-fiction books
Books by Adolf Hitler
Censored books
Censorship in the Netherlands
Conspiracist media
Historical negationism
Nazi books
Nazi propaganda
Political autobiographies
Political manifestos
Prison writings
Propaganda books and pamphlets
Public domain books